Nadia Bouras (born 1981, Amsterdam, The Netherlands) is a Dutch historian of Moroccan descent.

She graduated in history at the Free University of Amsterdam. In 2012 she published her Ph.D.-thesis, Het Land van Herkomst, Perspectieven op verbondenheid met Marokko, 1960-2010, (The Country of Origin, Perspectives on Alliance with Morocco, 1960-2010). She is one of four Moroccan Dutch members of the "Conseil de la Communauté Marocaine à l'Étranger" (Assembly of Overseas Moroccan Community Council) or CCME. In celebration of the 40th anniversary of the treaty allowing mass-recruitment of Moroccans for Dutch industries, Bouras (together with Annemarie Cottaar and Fatiha Laouikili) has written a book entitled "Marokkanen in Nederland: de pioniers vertellen" (Moroccans in The Netherlands: the pioneers tell, ed. Meulenhof 2009). The book deals with the history of arrival, settlement and integration of Moroccans in Dutch society.

References

External links

 Personal Homepage at Leiden University
 Debate between Nadia Bouras and Liberal MP Halbe Zijlstra in talk show Pauw en Witteman

1981 births
Living people
21st-century Dutch historians
Dutch women historians
Dutch people of Moroccan descent
Vrije Universiteit Amsterdam alumni
Academic staff of Leiden University
Writers from Amsterdam